Saint-Abraham is a commune in the Morbihan department of Brittany in north-western France.

See also
Communes of the Morbihan department

References

External links

 Mayors of Morbihan Association 

Saintabraham